Alexander Gustavo Sánchez Reyes (born 6 June 1984) is a Peruvian footballer who plays as an attacking midfielder for Deportivo Llacuabamba in the Peruvian Segunda División.

Club career
Sánchez is a former Alianza Lima youth club player that couldn't reach the first team despite his natural talent, the then youth club manager Víctor Rivera helped him with some psychological assistance to prevent Alexander to depress for his relegation to the youth team. Finally he could reach the first team but didn't get a chance to play so he was loaned to promoted club José Gálvez FBC during the 2006 season.

There he realised an awesome season and when he returned with Alianza Lima and played in the first team. He played the first games in the first team and he was the best player in the Peruvian derby between Alianza Lima and Universitario de Deportes scoring one goal but after that he didn't play many matches and at the end of the season he signed for GKS Bełchatów.

In September 2008, he announced that he signed a 1-year contract with the club Alianza Lima.

International career
He has made twelve appearances for the Peru national football team.

References

External links

1984 births
Living people
Footballers from Lima
Association football midfielders
Peruvian footballers
Peru international footballers
Club Alianza Lima footballers
José Gálvez FBC footballers
GKS Bełchatów players
Club Deportivo Universidad de San Martín de Porres players
Club Deportivo Universidad César Vallejo footballers
Juan Aurich footballers
Universidad Técnica de Cajamarca footballers
Unión Comercio footballers
FBC Melgar footballers
Águilas Doradas Rionegro players
Peruvian Primera División players
Ekstraklasa players
Categoría Primera A players
Peruvian expatriate footballers
Peruvian expatriate sportspeople in Poland
Peruvian expatriate sportspeople in Colombia
Expatriate footballers in Poland
Expatriate footballers in Colombia